Oh Billy, Behave is a 1926 American silent comedy film directed by Grover Jones and starring Billy West, Charlotte Merriam and Lionel Belmore.

Cast
 Billy West as Edwin Dumwell 
 Charlotte Merriam as Diana Lovely 
 Lionel Belmore as Mr. Lovely 
 Jimmy Aubrey as The Nurse

References

Bibliography
 Munden, Kenneth White. The American Film Institute Catalog of Motion Pictures Produced in the United States, Part 1. University of California Press, 1997.

External links

1926 films
Silent American comedy films
Films directed by Grover Jones
American silent feature films
1920s English-language films
Rayart Pictures films
American black-and-white films
1926 comedy films
1920s American films